These are all the international matches played by Pakistan national field hockey team from 1960 to 1969.

Results

1960 
Test series

1960 Summer Olympics

1961 
Test series

1962 
Test series

Test series

1962 Asian Games

Test series

1963 
Lyon Hockey Festival

Test series

Test series

1964 
Test series

Test series

1964 Summer Olympics

1965 
Test series

Test series

1966 

Hamburg Hockey Festival

Test series

Test series

1966 Asian Games

1967 
Test series

Test series

London Hockey Festival

1968 
Lahore Hockey Festival

Four Nations Nairobi

Test series

Test series

1968 Summer Olympics

Test series

1969 
Eight Nations Lahore

Test series

Test series

Head-to-head record 

1960s in Pakistani sport
Field hockey in Pakistan